The Vinnell Corporation is an international private military company based in Herndon, Virginia, United States, specializing in military training, logistics, and support in the form of weapon systems maintenance and management consultancy. Vinnell Corporation is a subsidiary of Northrop Grumman Corporation. They are also party to other joint-venture companies, e.g. Vinnell-Brown & Root (VBR). The Vinnell Corporation was mentioned in Fahrenheit 9/11 for its connections to the Carlyle Group, George W. Bush, and the Saudi Royal family.

They conducted training of portions of the Saudi Arabian National Guard as a joint Saudi/American owned company called Vinnell Arabia since the 1970s. Vinnell Arabia was bombed on May 12, 2003 by Saudi terrorists. Eight Americans and two Filipinos were killed. Another employee was stalked from the military hospital to his home in Riyadh and assassinated on the street.

Vinnell Corporation was given the initial contract to recreate the New Iraqi Army in 2003 by the U.S. Department of Defense. The contract was for nine battalions, with an option to extend the training to 27 battalions. In the event, the second phase was taken over by regular U.S. military forces.

History

Vinnell Corporation was founded in 1931 in Alhambra, California, by Allan S. Vinnell, as a hauling and excavating contractor. The company grew into construction of roads and buildings and constructed portions of the Pan-American Highway, as well as Dodger Stadium and portions of the Grand Coulee Dam. It had also diversified into production of steel and into mining operations. Vinnell also performed construction for the U.S. Military Assistance Command Vietnam and/or similar Federal Government organizations such as the Navy's Officer in Charge of Construction RVN in Vietnam in the 1960s.

The company moved into operations, maintenance, and training largely in the 1970s. In 1975, the company undertook the Saudi Arabian National Guard Modernization Program. In 1979, it moved into the Job Corps arena with the operation of the Shreveport (LA) center and later operated the Hubert H. Humphrey center in St. Paul, MN; the Roswell (NM) center; the Laredo (TX) center; the Joliet (IL) center; the Gainesville (FL) center; the North Texas (formerly McKinney) center; and the Whitney Young center in Shelbyville, KY.

In 1992, the company was acquired by BDM International, which was in turn acquired by TRW Inc. in 1997. TRW was acquired by Northrop Grumman in 2002.

Notes

External links 
 Vinnell Corporation
 Al-Qaeda hated corporation
 Vinnell-Brown & Root
 www.wikimapia.org
 Vinnell Corporation at Sourcewatch
 View of "Camp Vinnell"

Companies based in Fairfax County, Virginia
Defense companies of the United States
The Carlyle Group companies
Private equity portfolio companies
Private military contractors